Joffrey Boulanger (born 18 August 1989), better known by his stage name Olympe, is a French singer originating from Amiens, France. He was a contestant in the French television show The Voice: la plus belle voix.

Beginnings
Bolanger's parents separated when he was just 5 and he was raised alongside his brother and sister by his paternal grandparents. A timid child, he found solace in music. In 2001, his grandparent enrolled him in a song contest that he won after singing a Celine Dion song. He went on to take part in about 15 various competitions winning many. After a casting in April 2007, he was invited to sing "Vivo per lei" in a duo with Hélène Ségara during a concert in Albert, Somme.

In 2010, under the name Joffrey B, he released his first studio album recording titled Rien qu'un homme on small C Du Lourd label. The label that had the rights reissued the album February 2013. A music video was also released on the occasion for the song "Par la fenêtre". Based on this success, he took part in a television competition Vous avez du talent! on IDF1 channel where he sang "Je vis comme je rêve", one of the original recordings from his album Rien qu'un homme.

I  2013, he also landed a role in the musical comedy Atlantéa 2013 - Du Sphinx à l'Atlantide.

The Voice: la plus belle voix
At age 23, he auditioned for the program's second season in 2013 singing "Born to Die" from Lana Del Rey and became part of Team Jenifer. His rendition appeared at #1 on the French iTunes charts for the week. Reaching the final, he finished runner-up to eventual winner Yoann Fréget.

After The Voice
After the show, he was signed to Mercury Records (France) label where he released his self-titled debut album Olympe on 22 July 2013 with the album reaching number 1 on SNEP, the official French Albums Chart. The album was composed of studio versions of his interpretations during the season on the show plus one new song titled "Merci".

In December 2013, he sang on the compilation We Love Disney in a duet with Joyce Jonathan. He was invited to the 2014 NRJ Music Awards where he sang a duet with Alex Hepburn.

A new studio album followed in May 2014 titled Une vie par jour. The debut single from the album was 'C'est facile" accompanied with a music video. He will tour France for promotion of the album including a gig in Trianon in Paris.

Discography

Albums

Singles

Other charted songs

References

The Voice (franchise) contestants
1989 births
Living people
People from Amiens
21st-century French singers
21st-century French male singers